The Bhambavli Vajrai Waterfall is a waterfall located on the Urmodi river in India.

References

Waterfalls of Maharashtra
Tourist attractions in Satara district
Tiered waterfalls
Satara (city)